Boyd County is a county located in the U.S. state of Kentucky. As of the 2020 census, its population was 48,261. The county seat is Catlettsburg, and its largest city is Ashland. The county was formed in 1860. Its  are found at the northeastern edge of the state near the Ohio River and Big Sandy River, nestled in the verdant rolling hills of Appalachia. Boyd County is in the Huntington-Ashland, WV-KY-OH metropolitan statistical area.

History

Boyd County was the 107th of 120 counties formed in Kentucky and was established in 1860 from parts of surrounding Greenup, Carter, and Lawrence Counties. It was named for Linn Boyd of Paducah, former U.S. congressman, speaker of the United States House of Representatives, who died in 1859 soon after being elected lieutenant governor of Kentucky.

The earliest evidence of human habitation in Boyd County exists in the forms of numerous earthen mounds containing human skeletons and burial goods, giving evidence that prehistoric Native Americans inhabited the area. A 1973 archeological find revealed a serpent-shaped mound built of rocks dating to 2000 BC and stretching for  along a ridge parallel to the Big Sandy River south of Catlettsburg.

One of the early settlers in what is now Boyd County was Charles ("One-handed Charley") Smith, from Virginia. A veteran of the French and Indian War who had served under Col. George Washington in 1754, Smith received for that service roughly  around Chadwicks Creek, where he built a cabin in 1774. Smith died in 1776, and in 1797, this land passed to Alexander Catlett for whom the town of Catlettsburg is named.

The Poage family arrived from Staunton, Virginia, in October 1799 and formed Poage's Landing, later renamed the city of Ashland.

The first courthouse built in 1861 was replaced in 1912.

Industry
Members of the Poage family built the steam-powered Clinton iron furnace in 1832, the earliest industry in present-day Boyd County.  A total of 29 charcoal-fueled iron furnaces operated on the Kentucky side of the Ohio River, seven of them in present-day Boyd County.

The Kentucky Iron, Coal and Manufacturing Company was incorporated on March 8, 1854, and it laid out the town of Ashland, then within Greenup County. The company purchased thousands of acres of coal, timber, and ore lands throughout the county. It invested US$210,000 in bonds of the Lexington & Big Sandy River Railroad Company, with the stipulation that the eastern division of that line extend into Ashland instead of ending, as originally planned, in Catlettsburg.  The early presence of the railroad in Ashland was largely responsible for this city becoming the dominant municipality of the county.

Ashland furnace was sold to American Rolling Mill Company in 1921, which developed into Armco Steel Corporation.  In 1963, Armco constructed the Amanda furnace, one of the largest blast furnaces in the world.  Known today as AK Steel, the industry remains a major employer in northeastern Kentucky.

Ashland Oil, Inc., at one time the largest corporation headquartered in Kentucky, was started in 1924 at Leach Station, south of Catlettsburg, by Paul G. Blazer.  Best known for their Valvoline Oil products, Ashland Oil relocated to Covington, Kentucky, in 1999, merged with Marathon Oil, and sold its remaining petroleum shares to Marathon in 2005, dissolving their petroleum division.  The original oil refinery, located in Catlettsburg, is still in operation today and is currently owned by Marathon Petroleum Corporation.

Calgon Carbon constructed the Big Sandy Plant in 1961 and it has since become the world's largest producer of granular activated carbon. The facility produces in excess of 100 million pounds of granular activated carbon annually.

Alcohol sales
On November 3, 2020, residents voted in favor of allowing full retail sales of alcohol countywide. Prior to November 2020, Boyd County only allowed alcohol sales in restaurants that seated over 100 people and derived at least 70% of their income from food sales. The one exception was three election precincts within the city of Ashland, covering the downtown area, where all retail alcohol sales were permitted.

Geography

Adjacent counties
 Greenup County  (northwest)
 Lawrence County, Ohio  (northeast)
 Wayne County, West Virginia  (east)
 Lawrence County  (south)
 Carter County  (west)

Demographics

As of the census of 2000, 49,752 people, 20,010 households, and 14,107 families were residing in the county. The racial makeup of the county was 95.97% White, 2.55% African American, 0.16% Native American, 0.30% Asian, 0.14% from other races, and 0.88% from two or more races. About 1.12% of the population were Hispanics or Latinos of any race.

Of the 20,010 households, 28.9% had children under 18 living with them, 55.7% were married couples living together, 11.6% had a female householder with no husband present, and 29.5% were not families. About 26.5% of all households were made up of individuals, and 12.2% had someone living alone who was 65  or older.  The average household size was 2.38, and the average family size was 2.86.

The age distribution was 21.80% under 18, 8.30% from 18 to 24, 28.70% from 25 to 44, 25.60% from 45 to 64, and 15.60% who were 65 or older.  The median age was 40 years. For every 100 females, there were 96.00 males.  For every 100 females 18 and over, there were 93.1 males.

The median income for a household in the county was $32,749, and for a family was $41,125. Males had a median income of $35,728 versus $22,591 for females. The per capita income for the county was $18,212.  About 11.5% of families and 15.5% of the population were below the poverty line, including 22.4% of those under 18 and 12.10% of those 65 or over.

Infrastructure

Kentucky State Police Post 14 is located on U.S. 60 in Summit, next to Armco Park. In addition to Boyd County, troopers from Post 14 serve Carter, Greenup, and Lawrence Counties.

Politics
Similar to many other Eastern Kentucky  counties, Boyd County voted primarily for Democratic candidates at the presidential level before shifting hard to the right in the 2000s. However, local Democratic support remains strong, as Democrat Andy Beshear won the county by about 6 points over incumbent Republican Matt Bevin in the 2019 gubernatorial election.

Voter registration

Education

Colleges
Ashland Community and Technical College, in Ashland, is one of 16 two-year, open-admissions colleges of the Kentucky Community and Technical College System. Morehead State University also has a satellite campus located in Ashland.

Public school districts
The county has these school districts:
 Boyd County Public School District serves the city of Catlettsburg and the surrounding county communities outside the city of Ashland and Westwood census-designated place, as well as portions of Ashland and portions of Westwood.
 Ashland Independent School District serves most of the city of Ashland and some unincorporated areas.
 Fairview Independent School District serves most of the census-designated place of Westwood and a portion of Ashland.

Private schools
 Holy Family School is affiliated with the Holy Family Catholic Church and currently offers K-12 education.
 Rose Hill Christian is affiliated with the Rose Hill Baptist Church and also offers K-12 education.
 Calvary Christian School was housed at Grassland Community Church until it closed in August 2012.    A group of parents and teachers continued the school immediately following the closure, formed a new board, and renamed it Faith Christian Academy, which continued for an additional three school years in grades K4 - 8 and was affiliated with the Holy Family Collegiate High School for grades 9 - 12.  It formally closed in fall 2016.

Other schools
 Ramey-Estep High School

Communities

Cities
 Ashland
 Catlettsburg (county seat)

Census-designated places
 Cannonsburg
 Ironville
 Westwood

Unincorporated communities

 Burnaugh
 Coalton
 Durbin
 Kavanaugh
 Kilgore
 Lockwood
 Meads
 Normal
 Princess
 Rockdale
 Rush
 Summit
 Unity
 Westwood

 Winslow

See also
 Ashland Commercial Historic District
 Catlett House
 National Register of Historic Places listings in Boyd County, Kentucky

References

External links
 The Kentucky Highlands Project

 
Counties of Appalachia
Kentucky counties on the Ohio River
1860 establishments in Kentucky
Populated places established in 1860